Melling railway station served the village of Melling, Lancashire, England, from 1867 to 1952 on the Furness and Midland Joint Railway.

History 
It was sited between the western portal of the 1230yd (1118m) Melling Tunnel and the bridge carrying the railway across the A683 Lancaster to Kirkby Lonsdale road.

It was closed on 5 May 1952 by the British Transport Commission due to low patronage.  Though most of the structures were subsequently demolished, the station house is still extant and is used as a holiday cottage, whilst the former goods yard is used as commercial premises.  The line passing through also remains operational, as part of the Leeds to Morecambe Line.

References 

Disused railway stations in Lancaster
Former Furness Railway stations
Railway stations in Great Britain opened in 1867
Railway stations in Great Britain closed in 1952
1867 establishments in England
1952 disestablishments in England